Gordon Harvey Aiken (September 26, 1918 – February 12, 2000) was a Canadian lawyer, judge, and politician.

Born in Ripley, Ontario, he graduated from Osgoode Hall Law School in 1940. He was an officer of the Royal Hamilton Light Infantry during World War II serving in Europe. After the war, he practised law in Muskoka, Ontario and was a judge of the juvenile and family court from 1951 to 1956.

He was elected to the House of Commons of Canada representing the riding of Parry Sound—Muskoka in the 1957 federal election. A Progressive Conservative, he was re-elected five times in the 1958, 1962, 1963, 1965, and 1968 federal elections. From 1963 to 1972, he was the opposition critic in relation to the environment and was deputy house leader from 1967 to 1970.

He wrote the book The Backbencher - Trials and Tribulations of a Member of Parliament (1974, McClelland and Stewart Limited). He also wrote the book The Returning Officer, a historical novel set in Muskoka (RO Publishing).

References

 Gordon Harvey Aiken fonds at Library and Archives Canada
 
 
 

1918 births
2000 deaths
Canadian memoirists
Canadian people of Scottish descent
Members of the House of Commons of Canada from Ontario
Members of the United Church of Canada
People from Bruce County
Progressive Conservative Party of Canada MPs
20th-century memoirists